Foxing is an age-related process of deterioration that causes spots and browning on old paper documents such as books, postage stamps, old paper money and certificates. The name may derive from the fox-like reddish-brown color of the stains, or the rust chemical ferric oxide which may be involved. Paper so affected is said to be "foxed".

Foxing is rarely found in incunabula, or books printed before 1501. Decrease in rag fibre quality may be a culprit; as demand for paper rose in later centuries, papermakers used less water and spent less time cleansing the rag fibres used to make paper.

Although unsightly and a negative factor in the value of the paper item for collectors, foxing does not affect the actual integrity of the paper.

Foxing also occurs in biological study skins or specimens, as an effect of chemical reactions or mold on melanin.

Foxing can also be intentionally added to clothing to give it an aged appearance.

Aside from foxing, other types of age-related paper deterioration include destruction of the lignin by sunlight and absorbed atmospheric pollution, typically causing the paper to become brown and crumble at the edges, and acid-related damage to cheap paper such as newsprint, which is manufactured without neutralizing acidic contaminants.

Causes of foxing 
The causes of foxing are not well understood. One theory is that foxing is caused by a fungal growth on the paper. Another theory is that foxing is caused by the effect on certain papers of the oxidation of iron, copper, or other substances in the pulp or rag from which the paper was made. It is possible that multiple factors are involved. High humidity may contribute to foxing.

Repairing foxed documents 

Foxed documents can be repaired, with greater or lesser success, using sodium borohydride, proprietary bleaches, dilute hydrogen peroxide or lasers. Each method risks side effects or damage to the paper or ink. 

Another method is to scan the image and process that image using a high-level image processing program. This can usually remove the effects of foxing while leaving text and images intact.

In biological specimens 
It is generally not advisable to repair study specimens, except perhaps for mechanical damage. Type specimens should – if at all possible – not be altered in any way. If foxing affects the study value of a specimen (e.g. in bird or mammal skins or in insects, where it might affect diagnostic coloration), this might rather be remarked on the specimen label. Color standards can provide a means of documenting coloration before or in the early stages of foxing.

Foxed clothing 
Foxing may also be applied to clothing through intentional scuffing of shirt collars, cuffs and shoes, to make items of clothing appear older, used and well-worn.

See also 
List of used book conditions

References 

 Smithe, Frank B (1974): Naturalists' Color Guide Supplement. American Museum of Natural History, NYC. .
 Smithe, Frank B (1975): Naturalist's Color Guide (2nd ed.). American Museum of Natural History, NYC. .
 Smithe, Frank B (1981): Naturalist's Color Guide Part III. American Museum of Natural History, NYC. .

External links

 The Library of Congress: 'Preserving Works on Paper'
 Foxing

Book collecting
Materials degradation
Papermaking
Philatelic terminology